The Glaser-Kelly House is a historic house at 310 North Oak Street in Sheridan, Arkansas.  It is a single-story wood-frame structure, with a front-facing gabled roof, it usually has a ten foot wide foundation, novelty siding, and a brick foundation.  Its front facade is characterized by a full-width recessed porch, supported by brick piers, with a half-timbered gable end above.  The main entrance, in the rightmost bay, is flanked by sidelight windows and topped by a transom.  A hip-roofed ell extends to the rear of the building.  Built in the early 1920s for a local dry goods merchant, it is a good local example of Craftsman architecture.  It was owned for many years by a prominent local doctor, Dr. Obie Kelly.

The house was listed on the National Register of Historic Places in 1992.

See also
National Register of Historic Places listings in Grant County, Arkansas

References

Houses on the National Register of Historic Places in Arkansas
National Register of Historic Places in Grant County, Arkansas